Autódromo Ciudad de Concordia is a motorsports circuit located near Concordia, Entre Ríos, Argentina. The circuit also used to host the Formula 3 Sudamericana.

Events

 Former
 F4 Argentina Championship (2021)
 Formula 3 Sudamericana (1992, 2013)
 Formula 4 Sudamericana (2014)
 Porsche GT3 Cup Trophy Argentina (2018)
 TC2000 Championship (1981–1983, 1986, 1988–1989, 1992, 2004–2005, 2022)
 TC2000 Series (2013–2018, 2022)
 Top Race V6 (2005, 2009)
 Turismo Carretera (2014–2019, 2021–2022)
 Turismo Nacional (1969–1973, 1980, 1984, 1990, 1992–1993, 1996–2009, 2013–2015, 2017, 2019, 2021)

Lap records 

The official race lap records at the Autódromo Ciudad de Concordia are listed as:

References 

Motorsport venues in Entre Ríos Province
Concordia, Entre Ríos